Volodichthys is a genus of snailfishes found in deep water, more than , of southern oceans near Antarctica and southern South America. Its members were formerly included in the genus Careproctus.

Species
There are currently five recognized species in this genus:

 Volodichthys catherinae (Andriashev & Stein, 1998)
 Volodichthys herwigi (Andriashev, 1991)
 Volodichthys parini (Andriashev & Prirodina, 1990)
 Volodichthys smirnovi (Andriashev, 1991)
 Volodichthys solovjevae Balushkin, 2012

References

Liparidae